Bironella obscura is one of the three mosquito species in the subgenus Brugella of the genus Bironella. It is found in New Guinea.

References

External links 
 

Anophelinae
Insects of New Guinea
Insects described in 1975